Silent Assassin is an album by the Jamaican musicians Sly and Robbie, released in 1989 via Island Records.

Production
The album was produced by KRS-One, at the suggestion of Island; it was KRS's desire to make a "commercial" rap album. Queen Latifah and Young M.C., among others, make guest appearances on Silent Assassin.

Critical reception

The Washington Post wrote that "the rhythm grooves on Silent Assassin are deeper, sexier and more melodic than those on almost any other rap record." The Globe and Mail deemed the album "a tough, articulate, rhythmically powerful blend of modern reggae and rap and hip hop." The St. Petersburg Times considered "Dance Hall" "arguably the best rap track of 1989."

Trouser Press called it "an ambitious undertaking," writing that "Latifah rules the mic on 'Woman for the Job'." The Spin Alternative Record Guide thought that it "was scrupulously intelligent and involving, yet it was an '80s-style consolidation instead of a true fusion or '90s-style deconstruction."

Track listing

Personnel
Sly Dunbar - drums
Robbie Shakespeare - bass
KRS-One - production, vocals
Queen Latifah - vocals
Young M.C. - vocals
Shah of Brooklyn - vocals

References

1989 albums
Island Records albums
Sly and Robbie albums